Princess Amelia of Nassau-Weilburg (Amelia Charlotte Wilhelmina Louise; 7 August 1776 in Kirchheimbolanden – 19 February 1841 at Schaumburg Castle, near Limburg an der Lahn) was a Princess of Nassau by birth and by marriage Duchess of Anhalt-Bernburg.

Background 
Amelia was the daughter of  Charles Christian, Prince of Nassau-Weilburg and his wife the Dutch princess Princess Carolina of Orange-Nassau. Amelia was the 10th of 15 children born to the Prince and Princess of Nassau-Weilburg, as her mother was born a daughter of  William IV, Prince of Orange and the English princess Anne, Princess Royal and Princess of Orange a prestigious marriage for Amelia was to be expected. After arranging the marriages for her other daughters, Princess Carolina of Orange-Nassau could finally focus on finding a match for Amelia. Finally a suitable husband was found, in the summer of 1793, Amelia became engaged to Victor II, Prince of Anhalt-Bernburg-Schaumburg-Hoym.

Marriage and issue 
On 29 October 1793, she married in Weilburg to Victor II, Prince of Anhalt-Bernburg-Schaumburg-Hoym (2 November 1767 – 22 April 1812). They had four children:
 Princess Hermine of Anhalt-Bernburg-Schaumburg-Hoym (1797–1817), married Archduke Joseph, Palatine of Hungary
 Princess Adelheid of Anhalt-Bernburg-Schaumburg-Hoym (1800–1820)
 Princess Emma of Anhalt-Bernburg-Schaumburg-Hoym (1802–1858), married George II, Prince of Waldeck and Pyrmont and became the grandmother of Queen Emma of the Netherlands, who was named after her.
 Princess Ida of Anhalt-Bernburg-Schaumburg-Hoym (1804–1828) 
After Victor's death, she married on 15 February 1813 to Baron Frederick of Stein-Liebenstein-Barchfeld (14 February 1777 – 4 December 1849).

Ancestry

External links 
 

Princesses of Nassau-Weilburg
People from Donnersbergkreis
House of Nassau
1776 births
1841 deaths
People from Kirchheimbolanden
18th-century German people
19th-century German people
Daughters of monarchs
Remarried royal consorts